Wyatt Earp's Revenge is a 2012 American Western film about the legendary lawman Wyatt Earp.

It is a fictionalized account of an actual Old West event, the slaying of beautiful singer Dora Hand in Dodge City, Kansas, when Earp was a deputy there. In one of its many instances of dramatic license, the movie depicts Hand as Earp's sweetheart. The film's framing device is a reporter's interview with an aging Earp, who reminisces about the tragedy. (Val Kilmer plays the older Earp, while Shawn Roberts plays the younger one.) The film was released on March 6, 2012, in the United States. The film was produced by Jeff Schenck and Barry Barnholtz and directed by Michael Feifer. The screenplay was written by Darren Benjamin Shepherd.

Plot
Wyatt Earp sits down with a reporter in a suite at the Fairmont Hotel in San Francisco in 1907. The reporter is eager for information about the legendary "Buntline Special", a Colt six-shooter with a 12-inch barrel. He and Earp talk about how Earp became a famous lawman. Earp tells the story of how he became a fearless United States Marshal. In a flashback, a 30-year-old Wyatt Earp (Roberts) finds out that his first love, Dora Hand (DeGarmo), was murdered. He tracks the murderer down and teams up with his friend Doc Holliday (Bethel), Bat Masterson (Dallas), Charlie Bassett (Whyte) and Bill Tilghman (Fiehler).

Cast

 Val Kilmer as Wyatt Earp (Kilmer previously portrayed Doc Holliday in the 1993 film Tombstone)
 Shawn Roberts as a young Wyatt Earp
 Matt Dallas as Bat Masterson
 Wilson Bethel as Doc Holliday
 Daniel Booko as James "Spike" Kenedy
 Scott Whyte as Charlie Bassett
 Trace Adkins as Mifflin Kenedy
 Diana DeGarmo as Dora Hand, Earp's first love
 Steven Grayhm as Sam Kenedy
 Levi Fiehler as Bill Tilghman

References

External links
 

2012 films
American independent films
2012 Western (genre) films
American Western (genre) films
Cultural depictions of Wyatt Earp
Cultural depictions of Doc Holliday
Cultural depictions of Bat Masterson
2012 independent films
2010s English-language films
Films directed by Michael Feifer
2010s American films